|}

The Mares Novice Hurdle Championship Final is a Grade 1 National Hunt hurdle race in Ireland which is open to mares aged four years or older. It is run at Fairyhouse Racecourse over a distance of about 2 miles and 4 furlongs (4,023 metres), and during its running there are ten hurdle to be jumped. The race is for novice hurdlers, and it is scheduled to take place each year in late March or early April at Fairyhouse's Easter meeting.

The race was awarded Grade 3 status in 2004, raised to Grade 2 in 2011 and then to Grade 1 in 2013.

Records
Leading jockey since 1995 (3 wins):
 Paul Carberry - Bondi Storm (2001), Asian Maze (2005), Oscar Rebel (2008)
 Paul Townend -  Adriana Des Mottes (2014), Laurina (2018), Brandy Love (2022)Leading trainer since 1995 (6 wins):
 Willie Mullins – Nobody Told Me (2003), Annie Power (2013), Adriana Des Mottes (2014), Augusta Kate (2017), Laurina (2018), Brandy Love (2022)''

Winners

See also
 Horse racing in Ireland
 List of Irish National Hunt races

References
Racing Post:

National Hunt hurdle races
Fairyhouse Racecourse
National Hunt races in Ireland